Atlético de Madrid finally reached the UEFA Champions League, following its most successful season since its 1995–96 league title. In the wake of captain Fernando Torres departing for Liverpool, Atlético responded with the signings of Diego Forlán, Thiago Motta, Simão and José Antonio Reyes, aimed at propelling the club to the top. A few early defeats caused concern, but the partnership between youngster Sergio Agüero and Forlán gelled so well that the club managed 66 goals and 64 points. Thanks to the double victory against Sevilla, Atlético managed to take the final spot for the Champions League, surprisingly finishing only three points behind Barcelona in third.

Squad

Goalkeepers
  Christian Abbiati
  Leo Franco
  Ismael Falcón

Defenders
  Giourkas Seitaridis
  Antonio López
  Mariano Pernía
  Fabiano Eller
  Zé Castro
  Luis Perea
  Pablo Ibáñez
  Juan Valera
  Álvaro Domínguez
  César Ortiz

Midfielders
  Thiago Motta
  Cléber
  Raúl García
  Luis García
  Maxi Rodríguez (C)
  José Manuel Jurado
  José Antonio Reyes
  Maniche
  Miguel de las Cuevas
  Simão
  Roberto Batres
  Álex Quillo
  Didi
  Joshua
  Ignacio Camacho

Attackers
  Diego Forlán
  Sergio Agüero
  Mista

Competitions

La Liga

League table

Matches

Real Madrid–Atlético Madrid 2-1
 0-1 Sergio Agüero 
 1-1 Raúl 
 2-1 Wesley Sneijder 
Atlético Madrid–Mallorca 1-1
 0-1 Daniel Güiza 
 1-1 Mariano Pernía 
Real Murcia–Atlético Madrid 1-1
 0-1 Sergio Agüero 
 1-1 Francisco Gallardo 
Atlético Madrid–Racing Santander 4-0
 1-0 Raúl García 
 2-0 Sergio Agüero 
 3-0 Diego Forlán 
 4-0 Simão 
Athletic Bilbao–Atlético Madrid 0-2
 0-1 Sergio Agüero 
 0-2 Diego Forlán 
Atlético Madrid–Osasuna 2-0
 1-0 Raúl García 
 2-0 Sergio Agüero 
BarcelonaAtlético Madrid 3-0
 1-0 Deco 
 2-0 Lionel Messi 
 3-0 Xavi 
Atlético Madrid–Real Zaragoza 4-0
 1-0 Luis García 
 2-0 Diego Forlán 
 3-0 Maxi Rodríguez 
 4-0 Maxi Rodríguez 
Levante–Atlético Madrid 0-1
 0-1 Diego Forlán 
Atlético Madrid–Sevilla 4-3
 1-0 Maniche 
 1-1 Luís Fabiano 
 2-1 Sergio Agüero 
 2-2 Zé Castro 
 3-2 Maxi Rodríguez 
 4-2 José Manuel Jurado 
 4-3 Luís Fabiano 
Atlético Madrid–Villarreal 3-4
 1-0 Pablo 
 2-0 Simão 
 2-1 Giuseppe Rossi 
 2-2 Fabricio Fuentes 
 3-2 Sergio Agüero 
 3-3 Nihat Kahveci 
 3-4 Nihat Kahveci 
Almería–Atlético Madrid 0-0
Atlético Madrid–Valladolid 4-3
 1-0 Maniche 
 1-1 Víctor 
 1-2 Sisi 
 2-2 Maxi Rodríguez 
 2-3 Joseba Llorente 
 3-3 Maxi Rodríguez 
 4-3 Pedro López 
Betis–Atlético Madrid 0-2
 0-1 Diego Forlán 
 0-2 Raúl García 
Atlético Madrid–Getafe 1-0
 1-0 Diego Forlán 
Recreativo de Huelva–Atlético Madrid 0-0
Atlético Madrid–Espanyol 1-2
 1-0 Simão 
 1-1 Raúl Tamudo 
 1-2 Luis García 
Deportivo–Atlético Madrid 0-3
 0-1 Diego Forlán 
 0-2 Sergio Agüero 
 0-3 José Manuel Jurado 
Atlético Madrid–Valencia 1-0
 1-0 Sergio Agüero 
Atlético Madrid–Real Madrid 0-2
 0-1 Raúl 
 0-2 Ruud van Nistelrooy 
Mallorca–Atlético Madrid 1-0
 1-0 Juan Arango 
Atlético Madrid–Real Murcia 1-1
 0-1 Jofre 
 1-1 Luis García 
Racing de Santander–Atlético Madrid 0-2
 0-1 Diego Forlán 
 0-2 Diego Forlán 
Atlético Madrid–Athletic Bilbao 1-2
 1-0 Antonio López 
 1-1 Markel Susaeta 
 1-2 Fernando Llorente 
Osasuna–Atlético Madrid 3-1
 1-0 Kike Sola 
 2-0 Carlos Vela 
 2-1 Diego Forlán 
 3-1 Héctor Font 
Atlético Madrid–Barcelona 4-2
 0-1 Ronaldinho 
 1-1 Sergio Agüero 
 2-1 Maxi Rodríguez 
 3-1 Diego Forlán 
 4-1 Sergio Agüero 
 4-2 Samuel Eto'o 
Real Zaragoza–Atlético Madrid 2-1
 0-1 Simão 
 1-1 Pablo 
 2-1 Diego Milito 
Atlético Madrid–Levante 3-0
 1-0 Simão 
 2-0 Diego Forlán 
 3-0 Diego Forlán 
Sevilla–Atlético Madrid 1-2
 0-1 Maxi Rodríguez 
 1-1 Diego Capel 
 1-2 Sergio Agüero 
Villarreal–Atlético Madrid 3-0
 1-0 Santi Cazorla 
 2-0 Nihat Kahveci 
 3-0 Nihat Kahveci 
Atlético Madrid–Almería 6-3
 1-0 Antonio López 
 2-0 Diego Forlán 
 2-1 Felipe Melo 
 2-2 Juanma Ortiz 
 3-2 Simão 
 3-3 Álvaro Negredo 
 4-3 Simão 
 5-3 Sergio Agüero 
 6-3 Sergio Agüero 
Valladolid–Atlético Madrid 1-1
 0-1 Maxi Rodríguez 
 1-1 Bartholomew Ogbeche 
Atlético Madrid–Betis 1-3
 0-1 Juande 
 1-1 Sergio Agüero 
 1-2 Xisco 
 1-3 Capi 
Getafe–Atlético Madrid 1-1
 1-0 Juan Ángel Albín 
 1-1 Sergio Agüero 
Atlético Madrid–Recreativo de Huelva 3-0
 1-0 Ignacio Camacho 
 2-0 Sergio Agüero 
 3-0 Ignacio Camacho 
Espanyol–Atlético Madrid 0-2
 0-1 Sergio Agüero 
 0-2 Diego Forlán 
Atlético Madrid–Deportivo 1-0
 1-0 Diego Forlán 
Valencia–Atlético Madrid 3-1
 1-0 Giourkas Seitaridis 
 2-0 David Villa 
 3-0 David Villa 
 3-1 Sergio Agüero

Topscorers
  Sergio Agüero 19
  Diego Forlán 16
  Maxi Rodríguez 8
  Raúl García 3

UEFA Cup

Group stage

Lokomotiv Moscow–Atlético Madrid 3-3
 0-1 Sergio Agüero 
 1-1 Diniyar Bilyaletdinov 
 1-2 Diego Forlán 
 2-2 Peter Odemwingie 
 3-2 Peter Odemwingie 
 3-3 Sergio Agüero 
Atlético Madrid–Aberdeen 2-0
 1-0 Diego Forlán 
 2-0 Jamie Langfield 
Copenhagen–Atlético Madrid 0-2
 0-1 Simão 
 0-2 Sergio Agüero 
Atlético Madrid–Panathinaikos 2-1
 0-1 Dimitris Salpingidis 
 1-1 Luis García 
 2-1 Simão

Last 32

Bolton Wanderers–Atlético Madrid 1-0
 1-0 El Hadji Diouf 
Atlético Madrid–Bolton Wanderers 0-0

Atlético Madrid seasons
Atletico Madrid